Hamza Sanhaji (Arabic:حمزة صنهاجي; born 22 April 1994) is a Moroccan-born Qatari footballer. He last played for Al-Zawraa.

International career
Sanhaji was born in Morocco, but moved to Qatar at a young age. Sanhaji represented the Qatar U23s at the 2015 WAFF U-23 Championship. He scored two goals in 4 appearances at the tournament.

Career statistics

Club

References

External links
 

1994 births
Living people
People from Casablanca
Qatari footballers
Qatar youth international footballers
Moroccan footballers
Moroccan emigrants to Qatar
Naturalised citizens of Qatar
Qatari people of Moroccan descent
Al Sadd SC players
El Jaish SC players
K.A.S. Eupen players
Difaâ Hassani El Jadidi players
Al-Markhiya SC players
MC Oujda players
Al-Ahli Club (Manama) players
Qatar Stars League players
Belgian Pro League players
Botola players
Qatari Second Division players
Bahraini Premier League players
Qatari expatriate footballers
Moroccan expatriate footballers
Expatriate footballers in Belgium
Expatriate footballers in Bahrain
Qatari expatriate sportspeople in Belgium
Moroccan expatriate sportspeople in Belgium
Moroccan expatriate sportspeople in Bahrain
Association football forwards